Felecia Angelle (born July 27, 1986) is an American voice actress and ADR director affiliated with Funimation. She has provided voices for a number of English language versions of Japanese anime films and television series. Angelle is best known as the voice of Kohaku from Dr. Stone, the anime voice of Aoi Asahina from the Danganronpa series, Alex Benedetto from Gangsta, Mana Takamiya from Date A Live, Shikimi Shiramine from Love Tyrant, Sonia Summers from Bem, Alicia VII from Akashic Records of Bastard Magic Instructor, Anzu from Ensemble Stars!, Rita Izumi from A Certain Scientific Accelerator, Kae Tojo from Shomin Sample, Funabori from D-Frag!, Frill from Wonder Egg Priority, Momiji from Code:Breaker, Lancelot from Sakura Wars the Animation, Waltrud Krupinski from Brave Witches, Fubuki from Kancolle: Kantai Collection, Nozomi Moritomo from The Rolling Girls, Shinoa Hīragi from Seraph of the End, Toru Hagakure from My Hero Academia, Emi Yusa from The Devil Is a Part-Timer! and Perona from One Piece.

Filmography

Anime

Film

Video games

References

External links
 
 
 

1986 births
Living people
Actresses from Dallas
American video game actresses
American voice actresses
American voice directors
21st-century American actresses
Actresses from Louisiana